Vanity set may refer to:

 Vanity set, a personal grooming accessory.
 The Vanity Set, an indie rock group.
 Vanity furniture set, a matched combination of a dressing table, a chair, and a makeup mirror.